Photographs and Notebooks is a collection of British author Bruce Chatwin's photographs and notebooks that were made during his life when he was working on his various novels and travel books. It was published posthumously in 1993 by Jonathan Cape.

1993 non-fiction books
Photographic collections and books
Books by Bruce Chatwin
Books published posthumously
Jonathan Cape books